The next general election to elect the members of the House of Representatives of the Netherlands is scheduled for March 2025, but may be held at an earlier date if a snap election is called.

Electoral system

Pursuant to articles C.1, C.2 and C.3 of the electoral law, elections for the House of Representatives take place every four years in March. The 150 members of the House of Representatives are elected by open list proportional representation. The number of seats per list is determined using the D'Hondt method. There is an official electoral threshold of 1/150th (0.67%) of votes to secure a seat. Voters have the option to cast a preferential vote. The seats won by a list are first allocated to the candidates who, in preferential votes, have received at least 25 percent of the number of votes needed for one seat (effectively 0.17% of the total votes), regardless of their placement on the electoral list. If multiple candidates from a list pass this threshold, their ordering is determined based on the number of votes received. Any remaining seats are allocated to candidates according to their placement on the electoral list.

Opinion polls

References

Future elections in Europe
Future elections in the Caribbean
2025
2025
2025
2025